Johann Summer (born 24 October 1951) is an Austrian former cyclist. He competed at the 1972, 1976 and 1980 Summer Olympics. He won the Austrian National Road Race Championships in 1977.

References

External links
 

1951 births
Living people
Austrian male cyclists
Olympic cyclists of Austria
Cyclists at the 1972 Summer Olympics
Cyclists at the 1976 Summer Olympics
Cyclists at the 1980 Summer Olympics
People from Südoststeiermark District
Sportspeople from Styria